The Gathering Storm is a BBC–HBO co-produced television biographical film about Winston Churchill in the years just prior to World War II. The title of the film is that of the first volume of Churchill's largely autobiographical six-volume history of the war, which covered the period from 1919 to 3 September 1939, the day he became First Lord of the Admiralty.

The film, directed by Richard Loncraine and written by Larry Ramin and Hugh Whitemore, stars Albert Finney as Churchill and Vanessa Redgrave as his wife Clementine Churchill ("Clemmie"). The film also features a supporting cast of British actors such as Derek Jacobi, Ronnie Barker (his first role since retiring in 1988), Jim Broadbent, Tom Wilkinson, Celia Imrie, Linus Roache and Hugh Bonneville, and is notable for an early appearance by a young Tom Hiddleston.  Lena Headey, Simon Williams, and Edward Hardwicke all make brief appearances amongst the supporting cast. Among the film's executive producers were Ridley Scott and Tony Scott.  Originally the film was named The Lonely War.

Finney gained many accolades for his performance, winning both a BAFTA Award for Best Actor and an Emmy for Outstanding Lead Actor. Ramin and Whitemore won the Emmy for Outstanding Writing. It won a Peabody Award in 2002 for being "a portrait of a 20th Century hero’s return from political obscurity to direct the destiny of a nation." In 2016, Mark Lawson of The Guardian ranked it as the most memorable television portrayal of Churchill. A sequel, Into the Storm, was released in 2009, with Churchill portrayed by Brendan Gleeson, which focuses on the prime minister's days in office during World War II.

Plot

In 1934, Winston Churchill is deep in his wilderness years, and struggling to complete his biography of his ancestor the Duke of Marlborough, which he hopes will revive his fortunes. Winston is chided by his wife Clemmie for their lack of money and is aware that as a 'man of destiny' his moment may have passed. At the same time he struggles in the House of Commons as a backbencher to get a hearing for his concerns about German re-armament under Hitler and the policy of appeasement. Churchill is also disappointed by the behaviour of his son Randolph Churchill (Tom Hiddleston), which leads to further arguments with Clemmie, who announces she is leaving to go on an extended overseas trip. Churchill is devastated and throws himself into his pet activities: painting, and building walls around the family house. Clemmie eventually returns, and the couple are reconciled.

A young official in the government, Ralph Wigram (Linus Roache) has become concerned about the growth of the German Luftwaffe (air force), and is convinced by his wife to leak information about it to Churchill.

Shortly afterwards, Churchill uses Wigram's information to launch an attack on the appeasement policies of Prime Minister Stanley Baldwin (Derek Jacobi). In 1936, Wigram commits suicide.

With Churchill's fortunes restored, by September 1939, with the declaration of war against Germany at the start of World War II, and the announcement that Churchill will be taking over command of the Royal Navy again as First Lord of the Admiralty. An impatient Churchill bids farewell to the staff at the country house, and travels to London. Arriving in the middle of the night at the Admiralty, Churchill is met by a Royal Marine corporal who informs him the fleet have already been signalled that "Winston is Back", to which Churchill triumphantly replies, "And so he bloody well is!"

Cast

 Albert Finney as Winston Churchill
 Vanessa Redgrave as Clementine "Clemmie" Churchill
 Jim Broadbent as Desmond Morton
 Linus Roache as Ralph Wigram
 Lena Headey as Ava Wigram
 Derek Jacobi as Stanley Baldwin
 Ronnie Barker as David Inches
 Tom Wilkinson as Sir Robert Vansittart
 Celia Imrie as Violet Pearman
 Hugh Bonneville as Ivo Pettifer
 Gottfried John as Friedrich von Schroder
Anthony Brophy as Brendan Bracken
 Edward Hardwicke as Mr. Wood
 Tom Hiddleston as Randolph Churchill
 Tim Bentinck as John Churchill, 1st Duke of Marlborough, Churchill's ancestor
 Dolly Wells as Sarah Churchill
Emma Seigel as Mary Churchill
 Nancy Carroll as Diana Churchill
 John Standing as Lord Moyne
Gerrard McArthur as Vic Oliver

Locations
Chartwell House was Churchill's real-life family home and was used for the scenes at his house and grounds.

Note: None of the scenes in the film of inside Charwell were shot inside the house. They built a perfect replica of the rooms in Chartwell on the lawn.

Reception
In 2016, Mark Lawson of The Guardian chose The Gathering Storm as the most memorable television portrayal of Churchill. He wrote: "This BBC-HBO account of Churchill's return from exile to save his nation will always be the one to beat. Finney doesn’t take many roles, and his meticulous preparation is apparent: he uncannily walks and talks almost exactly as Churchill did, while also vividly suggesting – especially in a scene where the leader, nude in his bathroom, dictates a speech to a secretary – the character’s battles between body and mind."

The review aggregation website Rotten Tomatoes gave the film a 83% approval rating based on 6 reviews, with an average rating of 6.60/10.

Awards and nominations

See also
 Into the Storm – 2009 sequel starring Brendan Gleeson
 The Gathering Storm – 1974 similar film starring Richard Burton
 Darkest Hour – 2017 film starring Gary Oldman

References

External links
 
 The Observer – The man who told Churchill to take on Hitler
 The Scotsman – Filming on hallowed ground
 Review at The International Churchill Society

2002 films
2002 television films
British television films
BBC television dramas
Best Miniseries or Television Movie Golden Globe winners
Cultural depictions of John Churchill, Duke of Marlborough
Cultural depictions of Stanley Baldwin
Cultural depictions of Winston Churchill
Films about Winston Churchill
Films directed by Richard Loncraine
Films set in the 1930s
Films with screenplays by Hugh Whitemore
HBO Films films
Peabody Award-winning broadcasts
Primetime Emmy Award for Outstanding Made for Television Movie winners
Scott Free Productions films
American television films
American biographical films
American films based on actual events
British films based on actual events
2000s American films